Irina Olga Hasnaş (born 15 July 1954) is a Romanian composer. She was born in Bucharest, Romania, and studied at the Ciprian Porumbescu Academy of Music with Ştefan Niculescu, Aurel Stroe,  Alexandru Paşcanu and Nicolae Beloiu. She continued her studies with composer Theodor Grigoriu, and in 2000 received a doctorate in music from the Cluj-Napoca Academy of Music. After completing her studies, Hasnas worked as a composer and an editor for Romanian National Radio. Her works have been performed internationally.

Works
Selected works include:
Concerto for Orchestra, (1978)
Evocation, (1980) lyric poem for chamber orchestra
Symphony I, for orchestra (1990)
Metamorphose, for chamber and vocal ensemble (1978)
Melismas, for piano (1979)
Voices of Mioritza, for wind quintet (1980)
Polychomie, for chamber ensemble and tape (1982)
Evolutio I, for clarinet and string quartet (1983)
Evolutio II, for trio - oboe, cello and piano (1985)
Evolutio III, for string quartet (1988)
Monodie, for solo bassoon (1989)
Games, for solo cello (1993)
Inner Voices, for wind quintet (1994)
Endless Column, for solo flute ( 1996)
The Musical Box, for trio – clarinet,piano and violin (2000)
The Rooster, The light announcer, for bassclarinet, clarinet, alto, violin, piano and percussion (2005)
Dance, for bassoon and violin (2009)
A Possible Valse, for solo bassoon 2010
Romania, poem for chorus on the lignes of Ioan Alexandru (1981)
The Earth, cycle of four songs for mezzo-soprano, clarinet, cello, percussion and tape on the lignes of Ion Barbu (1983)
The Time, cycle of four songs for soprano or tenor, violin, alto and cello on the lignes of Nichita Stanescu (1983)
Metamorphose, cycle of five songs for soprano and piano on the lignes of Nichita Stanescu (1990)

References

1954 births
Living people
20th-century classical composers
Women classical composers
Romanian classical composers
20th-century women composers